The Cockettes is a 2002 American documentary film. It was directed by Bill Weber and David Weissman, and produced by Weissman. Its subject is the 1960s-70s San Francisco  performance group The Cockettes. The film debuted at the 2002 Sundance Film Festival, where it was nominated for the Grand Jury Prize. It went on to a limited theatrical release and to play the film festival circuit. The film received the LA Film Critics Award for Best Documentary of 2002.

Cast
 Sylvia Miles
 John Waters
 Dusty Dawn
 Larry Brinkin
 John Flowers
 Goldie Glitters
 Ann Harris
 Fayette Hauser
 Michael Kalmen

Archive footage
 Divine
 Jackie Curtis
 Hibiscus
 Angela Lansbury
 Anthony Perkins
 Ronald Reagan
 Gore Vidal
 Sylvester
 The Grateful Dead
 Taylor Mead
 Richard and Tricia Nixon

DVD release
The Cockettes was released on Region 1 DVD on January 21, 2003.

See also
Dzi Croquettes, a documentary film about a Brazilian ensemble inspired by the Cockettes.

References

External links
 
 

2002 films
Documentary films about entertainers
Documentary films about San Francisco
Documentary films about cross-dressing
Drag (clothing)-related films
2002 LGBT-related films
2000s English-language films